Follow the Leader may refer to:

Film and television
Follow the Leader (1930 film), starring Ed Wynn
Follow the Leader (1944 film), featuring the East Side Kids
"Follow the Leader" (Lost), a 2009 episode of the television series Lost
Follow the Leader (TV series), a 1953 American television series

Music
Follow the Leader (Eric B. & Rakim album), 1988
"Follow the Leader" (Eric B. & Rakim song), 1988
Follow the Leader (Korn album), 1998
"Follow the Leader", a song by Redd Kross from Show World, 1997 
"Follow the Leader" (Wisin & Yandel song), 2012
"Follow the Leaders", a song by Killing Joke, 1981
"Follow the Leader", a song in the 1953 film Peter Pan

Other uses
Follow the leader (game), a children's activity game
Follow-the-leader, a drill used by marching bands
Follow the leader, a type of participation dance